The St Katherine's Church is on Buttery Lane, Teversal, Nottinghamshire, England. It is an active Church of England parish church in the deanery of Newstead, the Archdeaconry of Newark, and the Southwell and Nottingham diocese.  Its benefice has three churches, St Andrew's Church, Skegby, All Saints' Church, Stanton Hill and St Katherine's itself. The church is recorded in the National Heritage List for England as a designated Grade I listed building.

The church was built in the 12th and 13th centuries and has an unrestored 17th and 18th century interior. The Molyneux pew is in the south aisle and has a roof supported by barley-sugar columns.

History

The church is medieval and is the family church of the Earl of Carnarvon.

Bells

The third bell is one of the oldest bells in Nottinghamshire dated 1551.

Monuments
There are two early ledger stones, for Roger Greenhalghe (d. 1562) and his wife Anne Babington (d. 1538).

There are various monuments to the Molyneux Baronets
Sir Francis Molyneux, 2nd Baronet, died 1674, son of Sir John Molyneux, 1st Baronet.
Sir John Molyneux, died 1691
Sir John Molyneux, died 1741

See also

Grade I listed buildings in Nottinghamshire
Listed buildings in Teversal

Sources

Church of England church buildings in Nottinghamshire
Grade I listed churches in Nottinghamshire